Storyist is a creative writing application for Mac OS X and iPad. Tailored for novelists and screenwriters, it provides a word processor, a cork board with support for index cards and photos, an outliner, and a project manager.

Features

Word processing
 Support for comments, images, headers, footers, style sheets, 2-up editing, and mirrored pages.
 Automatic manuscript and screenplay formatting.
 Text Inspector for quick editing of formatting, style, and page settings.
 Style sheets support formatted manuscripts and screenplays.
 Support for comments, bookmarks, and Wiki links.
 Automator action-based text plugins that extend application functionality.
 Full-screen editing mode.

Story development
 Cork board with support for photos and index cards.
 Collage view to visualize the relationships between story elements.
 Color-coding outliner.
 Customizable plot, character, and setting sheets.
 Story organization and tracking of plot, character, and settings.

Project management
 Project view to keep all project-related writing organized and accessible.
 Import and export support for popular file formats, including RTF, .doc, .docx, HTML, and Final Draft.
 Automator workflow support to handle routine import and export tasks like smart quote conversion and style replacement.
 Export ePub-formatted eBooks.
 Synchronization between Mac and iPad via Dropbox.
 Supports storing in 3rd-party cloud.

See also
 Screenwriting software
 Scrivener (software)

References 

MacOS-only software
MacOS word processors
Screenwriting software
MacOS text-related software